Al-Rusafa Sport Club, is an Iraqi football team based in Baghdad, that plays in the Iraq Division Three.

Stadium
In August 2014, Al-Rusafa Stadium was opened by the governor of Baghdad in the Bob Al-Sham neighborhood at a cost of 489 million IQD, with a capacity of a thousand spectators.

Managerial history
 Mohammed Aboud 
 Salam Al-Magsousi

See also 
 2016–17 Iraq FA Cup

References

External links
 Al-Rusafa SC on Goalzz.com
 Iraq Clubs- Foundation Dates

2004 establishments in Iraq
Association football clubs established in 2004
Football clubs in Baghdad